Paramormia is a genus of flies belonging to the family Psychodidae.

Distribution
Europe, Asia, Africa and North America.

Species
Paramormia acuta (Krek, 1971)
Paramormia corniculata (Vaillant, 1973)
Paramormia cornuta (Nielsen, 1964)
Paramormia decipiens (Eaton, 1893)
Paramormia fluviatilis Ježek, 2004
Paramormia fratercula (Eaton, 1893)
Paramormia itoi (Tokunaga, 196)
Paramormia longipennis (Krek, 1972)
Paramormia pollinensis (Sarà, 1951)
Paramormia polyascoidea (Krek, 1971)
Paramormia subcostalis Ježek, 2004
Paramormia ustulata (Haliday, 1856)
Paramormia watermaelica (Vaillant, 1972)

References

Nematocera genera
Diptera of Asia
Diptera of Europe
Diptera of North America
Diptera of Africa
Psychodidae
Taxa named by Günther Enderlein